Guernica is a localidad in Presidente Perón Partido of Buenos Aires Province, Argentina. It is the administrative centre for the partido. Guernica is situated on the outskirts of the Greater Buenos Aires urban conurbation around 30 km from the autonomous city of Buenos Aires.

Guernica has a theatre called "Anfiteatro Municipal Homero Manzi", named after Homero Manzi.

External links

Populated places in Buenos Aires Province
Populated places established in 1993
Presidente Perón Partido
Cities in Argentina
1993 establishments in Argentina